Ullesthorpe railway station was a railway station serving Ullesthorpe in Leicestershire, England.

In 1844 the Midland Counties joined the North Midland Railway and the Birmingham and Derby Junction Railway to form the Midland Railway.

Originally named Ullesthorpe, the station was renamed several times: on 1 May 1879 it became Ullesthorpe for Lutterworth, being amended to Ullesthorpe and Lutterworth on 1 August 1897 before reverting to the original name on 1 February 1930.

British Railways closed the Leicester – Rugby line and its stations, including Ullesthorpe which closed on 1 January 1962.

References

Railway stations in Great Britain opened in 1840
Railway stations in Great Britain closed in 1962
Former Midland Railway stations
Disused railway stations in Leicestershire
1840 establishments in England
Harborough District